Facundo Sánchez (born 7 March 1990) is an Argentine professional footballer who plays as a right back for Greek Super League club Panathinaikos.

Honours
Panathinaikos
Greek Cup: 2021–22

References

External links
 

1990 births
Living people
Argentine footballers
Argentine Primera División players
Super League Greece players
Club Atlético Colón footballers
Defensa y Justicia footballers
Club Atlético Tigre footballers
Estudiantes de La Plata footballers
Panathinaikos F.C. players
Argentine expatriate footballers
Argentine expatriate sportspeople in Greece
Expatriate footballers in Greece
Association football midfielders